Jarqooyeh Sofla District (Lower Jarqavieh District) is a district (bakhsh) in Isfahan County, Isfahan Province, Iran. At the 2006 census, its population was 20,970, in 5,473 families.  The District has three cities: Nikabad, Nasrabad, and Mohammadabad. The District has two rural districts (dehestan): Jarqavieh Sofla Rural District and Jarqavieh Vosta Rural District.

Nikabad is the most famous and well-known city in this district.

References 

Isfahan County
Districts of Isfahan Province